Robert Edward Wilson Jr. (August 16, 1913 – May 15, 1999) was an American football player.  He attended Southern Methodist University (SMU), where he played halfback for the SMU Mustangs football team from 1933 to 1935.  He was recognized as a consensus first-team All-American following his 1935 senior season.  Wilson was chosen by the National Football League's Brooklyn Dodgers in fifth round (40th pick overall) in the 1936 NFL Draft, and played a single season for the Dodgers in 1936.  Wilson was inducted into the College Football Hall of Fame in 1973, and died in 1999.

References

External links

1913 births
1999 deaths
American football halfbacks
Brooklyn Dodgers (NFL) players
SMU Mustangs football players
All-American college football players
College Football Hall of Fame inductees
People from Corsicana, Texas
People from Nacogdoches, Texas
Players of American football from Texas